Aryan TV is a Hindi-language 24/7 news television channel, owned by Aryan Films Limited. Aryan TV International channel is a regional TV channel for the Bihar & Jharkhand. The channel is also available on DD Free dish DTH at slot No. 614 and channel no. 103.

References

External links

Hindi-language television channels in India
Television channels and stations established in 2006
Hindi-language television stations
Television stations in Patna